Janet Lorraine Thurlow (May 21, 1926 – October 4, 2022) was an American jazz singer.

Biography

Early life
Thurlow was born on May 21, 1926, in Seattle – the first of five children. She took violin, piano, and singing lessons as a teenager. As a child, she sang on the Major Bowes Amateur Hour hosted by Major Edward Bowes. She attended Broadway High School in Seattle, but had to drop out after ninth grade to care for her siblings after her parents' divorce. A few years later, Thurlow moved into her own apartment after her mother's death, befriended a young Ray Charles, and began cultivating an appreciation of jazz as well as jazz singing.

In 1949, she began as a "song stylist" with Robert "Bumps" Blackwell's Seattle-based band, which at that time had a 16-year old Quincy Jones as arranger and trumpet player and Ray Charles, then known as "R.C.", playing piano and alto sax.

Lionel Hampton Orchestra
In 1950, Lionel Hampton hired her to play with his band. Thurlow convinced Hampton to hire her friend Quincy Jones as a trumpeter. In the April 1951, Thurlow recorded the song "I Can't Believe You're in Love with Me" with Hampton's orchestra for Decca Records.  wrote that this recording made "her perhaps the first white singer to front an all-Black big band." In August 1951, Thurlow performed with Hampton's orchestra at the Paramount Theater in Hollywood. At the end of that month, they performed at the Trianon Ballroom in Seattle that featured Jones and Thurlow as "Two Seattleites".

That same year, Thurlow met trombonist Jimmy Cleveland, a fellow band member with Hampton's orchestra. They married on April 2, 1953 in Chicago.

After Hampton
In November 1952, Thurlow converted to the Jehovah's Witnesses.

By April 1953, Thurlow had left Hampton's orchestra and was performing solo in Chicago.

Thurlow during this time began to volunteer as a violinist at Jehovah's Witnesses' regional conventions at New York's Yankee Stadium, Philadelphia's Connie Mack Stadium, and Los Angeles' Dodger Stadium.

Later life
Thurlow and her husband moved in 1967 from New York to Lynwood, California. Thurlow began teaching vocal music but did not begin to perform jazz again until 1983, when she began occasional performing and  recording with Cleveland until her husband's death in 2008.

Thurlow died of heart failure, aged 96, at St. Francis Medical Center in Lynwood in 2022. She was buried beside her husband at Riverside National Cemetery.

References

External links 
 
, sung with the Charles Mingus Octet
, sung with the Charles Mingus Octet

1926 births
2022 deaths
American women jazz singers
American jazz singers
American women music educators
People from Lynwood, California
Musicians from Seattle
Burials at Riverside National Cemetery